"Wait for Me" is a song by American rock band Rise Against, featured on their sixth studio album Endgame (2011). The song impacted radio on June 12, 2012. Written by lead vocalist Tim McIlrath, the track is notable for being one of the slower songs off the album. It was released as a promotional single in 2012, and was the final single released for Endgame. The song received positive reviews, with praise for its slower and methodical nature. It reached number 14 on the US Rock Songs chart, and was featured on the "Best Songs of the year" lists by KROQ-FM and WSUN-FM.

Background and composition

"Wait for Me" was written by lead vocalist Tim McIlrath in collaboration with the song's producers, Bill Stevenson and Jason Livermore. The latter two engineered the song alongside Andrew Berlin, while Chris Lord-Alge served as the mixer. It was recorded at The Blasting Room in Fort Collins, Colorado and mastered by Ted Jensen. McIlrath revealed it was his favorite track off Endgame, calling it a "fun song to put together". 

"Wait for Me" is notable for being one of the slower tracks off the album. McIlrath described the song as "more ballad-esque". While not a fully-fledged acoustic track, bassist Joe Principe felt that the song "kept the record in balance with the heavier songs and the fast songs". He also noted that there was no push to write a slower song for the album, and that "Wait for Me" came naturally for the band. Lyrically, McIlrath poses several questions, including "Do you see the world in black and grey?" Adam R. Holz of Plugged In interpreted the lyrics as "a desperate man who grew up in a broken home pleads for someone not to give up on him".

Reception and recognition

The song received positive reviews from music critics. Thomas Nassiff of AbsolutePunk felt that "Wait for Me" and fellow Endgame track "This Is Letting Go" were able to "show that Rise Against can slow things down a little without becoming forgettable". Kiel Hauck of PopMatters labeled the song as "infectious", praising McIlrath's vocals and the guitar work of Zach Blair. Alex Young of Consequence of Sound noted the contrast between the subtlety of "Wait for Me" and the ferocity of "Broken Mirrors", later commenting on how the tracks "destroy whatever weaker points were left uncovered via Appeal to Reason".

Loudwire listed the "Wait for Me" one of the 20 best songs of the week of August 6-11, 2012. California radio-station KROQ-FM named "Wait for Me" as number 42 on their list of the 50 best songs of 2012, while WSUN-FM listed it as the 39th best song that year.

Credits and personnel
Credits adapted from the liner notes of Endgame.

 Performed by Rise Against, with backing vocals by Chad Price
 Written by Tim McIlrath
 Produced by Bill Stevenson and Jason Livermore
 Recorded at The Blasting Room, Fort Collins, Colorado
 Audio engineering by Bill Stevenson, Jason Livermore, and Andrew Berlin
 Mixed by Chris Lord-Alge
 Mastered by Ted Jensen

Charts

Weekly charts

Year-end charts

References

2012 singles
Rise Against songs
Interscope Records singles
Songs written by Tim McIlrath
2011 songs
Songs written by Joe Principe
Songs written by Brandon Barnes
American alternative rock songs